Aptychodon (meaning "unwrinkled tooth") is an extinct genus of plesiosaur from the Cretaceous of what is now the Czech Republic. The genus was named by Reuss in 1855.

See also
 Timeline of plesiosaur research
 List of plesiosaur genera

References
 Sepkoski, J.J. (2002). "A compendium of fossil marine animal genera". Bulletins of American Paleontology 363:1-560

External links
 Aptychodon in the Paleobiology Database

Cretaceous plesiosaurs of Europe
Extinct animals of Europe
Fossil taxa described in 1855